The 2023 Munster Senior Hurling League, known for sponsorship reasons as the Co-Op Superstores Munster Hurling League, was an inter-county hurling competition in the province of Munster, played by all six county teams in January 2023.  were the winners, defeating  in the final.

Format
The teams were drawn into two groups of three teams. Each team played the other teams in its group once, earning 2 points for a win and 1 for a draw. The two group winners played in the final.

Group A

Group A table

Group A results

Group B

Group B table

Group B results

Knockout stage

Final

League statistics

Top scorers

Overall

In a single game

References

Munster Senior Hurling League
Munster Senior Hurling League